Cliff Leeming (2 February 1920 – February 2014) was an English footballer, who played as an inside forward in the Football League for Tranmere Rovers.
He was the son of Joe Leeming, a player for Bury.

References

External links

1920 births
2014 deaths
Tranmere Rovers F.C. players
Bury F.C. players
English Football League players
Association football inside forwards
Bolton Wanderers F.C. players
English footballers